Invitel is one of the dominant players in the Hungarian telecom and information market. Invitel has been operating in Hungary since 1995, through predecessor companies. Since 2002, the group has been using the name Invitel. The telecommunication company provides services to both residential and business customers as well as wholesale partners.

Ownership
Invitel is majority owned by Mid Europa Partners (MEP), which focuses on Central and Eastern Europe as a leading private equity investor. [1] Leaders of the group have more than 10 years of experience in investing in domestic markets and currently handle assets of around EUR 3.2 billion in funds. The MEP has brought significant knowledge to Invitel, primarily in the broadband telecommunications sector in the region, which is a strategic value.

In line with the customary practice in the telecommunications industry, Magyar Telecom B.V. (Matel), a wholly owned subsidiary of MEP, 100% directly owned by Invitel, was issued and refinanced at the Luxembourg Stock Exchange in 2004 to finance the Invitel Group. In 2013, Matel transformed the Group's capital structure to create a long-term sustainable financing structure for its optimal operation.

At the beginning of 2017, MEP sold its majority stake to the China-CEE Fund Private Equity Fund.

In July 2017, it was announced that DIGI Távközlési és Szolgáltató Kft. (Digi TV) will acquire the shares of Invitel.

References

External links
 

Telecommunications companies of Hungary
Hungarian brands
Telecommunications companies established in 1995
Internet service providers